The Critics' Choice Movie Award for Best Song is one of the awards given to people working in the motion picture industry by the Broadcast Film Critics Association.

Winners and nominees

1990s

2000s

2010s

2020s

See also
Academy Award for Best Original Song

References

S
Film awards for Best Song
Awards established in 1998